The A370 is a primary road in England running from the A4 Bath Road, near Bristol Temple Meads railway station to Weston-super-Mare before continuing to the village of East Brent in Somerset. A more direct route from Bristol to East Brent is the A38.

Route

Within Bristol urban area, the road begins at Bath Road roundabout, at the busy junction with A4 near Temple Meads. It then follows the new cut of River Avon west to Cumberland basin, via Bedminster.

From here on, it begins to head south-westwards out of the city. It first bypasses Long Ashton, then passes through Flax Bourton, Backwell, Brockley, Cleeve, Congresbury and Hewish, beyond which it crosses the M5 motorway at Junction 21.

The road then enters Weston-super-Mare: a dual carriageway extends most of the way, by passing the built-up area, including Junction 21 Enterprise Area to the east of the town. Previously the route of the A370 passed through Worle. On reaching the waterfront, the road turns south to run partly along the beach, then leaves Weston at Uphill. It passes Bleadon and Lympsham before meeting the A38 road at East Brent.

Condition

The A370 can get extremely busy during rush hour. Congestion points include the approaches to the M5 motorway, the traffic lights in Congresbury and the Long Ashton bypass—which now has a high-occupancy vehicle lane solely for use by buses, taxis, motorcycles, and cars with two or more occupants.

Future

As part of the "Greater Bristol Strategic Transport Study", a link road was under consideration to the south of Bristol. This is in part due to the congestion at Winterstoke Road and Barrow Gurney, both of which are very busy, especially the latter where the road can only accommodate travelling at one direction at a given time); and the incomplete Bristol Ring Road (A4174).

In 2017, the A370 Long Ashton By Pass was connected to the South Bristol Link (SBL) road, as part of the MetroBus rapid transit scheme, providing a new road linking Hengrove to Long Ashton By Pass and the Long Ashton Park & Ride. This follows much of the intended route for the Bristol Ring Road and carries the designation A4174, the same as the built section of ring road.

Points of interest

References

External links
 The Society for all British Road Enthusiasts (SABRE) entry on A370

Roads in England
Roads in Bristol
Roads in Somerset